General Colville may refer to:

Charles Colville (1770–1843), British Army general
Edward Colville (1905–1982), British Army major general

See also
Henry Edward Colvile (1852–1907), British Army major general